Andrei Aleksandrovich Zhdanov (– 31 August 1948) was a Soviet politician and cultural ideologist. After World War II, Zhdanov was thought to be the successor-in-waiting to Joseph Stalin but died before him. He has been described as the "propagandist-in-chief" of the Soviet Union from 1945 to 1948.

Early life 
Zhdanov was born in Mariupol (now Ukraine), where his father was a school inspector. His maternal grandfather was the former rector of the Moscow Theological Academy. He studied at the Moscow Commercial Institute. In 1914, he was drafted into the Russian army, graduated from an officers' school and served in the reserves. He joined the Bolsheviks in 1915. In 1917, he was chairman of the Shadrinsk committee of the Bolsheviks. He was a political commissar in the Red Army during the Russian Civil War and was elected chairman of the Tver soviet in 1923. From 1924 to 1934, he was first secretary of the Nizhny Novgorod provincial party committee.

Party secretary 
Zhdanov's first major promotion came at the end of the 17th Congress of the Communist Party of the Soviet Union, in February 1934, when he was transferred to Moscow as a secretary of the Central Committee, responsible for ideology. In that capacity, he inserted his protégé, Aleksandr Shcherbakov, as secretary of the Union of Soviet Writers, and gave the opening address to the first Soviet Writers' Congress in August 1934. In his speech, as well as paying tribute to "the guiding genius of our great leader and teacher, Comrade Stalin", he repeated Stalin's famous line that writers are "engineers of human souls". He declared that the only good literature was political:

Zhdanov's second great promotion followed the assassination of Sergei Kirov in December 1934, when he succeeded Kirov as first secretary of the Leningrad (Saint Petersburg) provincial party and was co-opted as a candidate member of the Politburo. Early in 1935, he and the head of the Leningrad NKVD, Leonid Zakovsky, organised the deportation of 11,702 so-called "Leningrad aristocrats", people who had belonged to the nobility or the middle class before the revolution. They also hunted any current or former party members suspected of having supported Leon Trotsky or the former Leningrad party boss, Grigory Zinoviev.

Role in the Great Purge 

Zhdanov has been described by J. Arch Getty as a key figure in the Great Purge, who advocated an approach that would make the party a vehicle for political education, ideological agitation and cadre preparation on a mass scale. Zhdanov's encouragement of rank-and-file mobilisation helped create momentum for the Great Terror. Though somewhat less active than Vyacheslav Molotov, Joseph Stalin, Lazar Kaganovich and Kliment Voroshilov, Zhdanov was a major perpetrator of the Great Terror and personally approved 176 documented execution lists. 
On a holiday with Stalin in August 1936, he co-signed the telegram that brought about the dismissal of the head of the NKVD, Genrikh Yagoda, who was accused, among other failings, of having impeded Zhdanov and Leonid Zakovsky in their purge of the Leningrad party organisation. During a Central Committee plenum in March 1937, Zhdanov announced that all provincial party secretaries were to be subject to re-election, a device that was used to remove them. Zhdanov was one of the few provincial party leaders in Russia to remain in post throughout the Great Purge.

In May 1937, he called leaders of the Leningrad party together to tell them that the long-time second secretary of the provincial party, Mikhail Chudov, and the former Mayor of Leningrad, Ivan Kodatsky, had been arrested. When an Old Bolshevik, Dora Lazurkina, went up to him afterwards to vouch for Kodatsky, Zhdanov warned her that such talk "will end badly for you". She was arrested and survived 17 years in the gulag.

After the Great Purge 
In September 1938, Zhdanov was appointed head of the reorganised Central Committee Directorate for Propaganda and Agitation, which brought all branches of the news media and arts under centralised party control. He was also Chairman of the Supreme Soviet of the Russian Soviet Federative Socialist Republic from July 1938 to June 1947 and from 1938 he was on the military council of the Soviet Navy.

His rise coincided with the fall of Nikolai Yezhov. At the 18th Party Congress, Zhdanov noted that "other means apart from repression" could be used to enforce "state and labour discipline". Zhdanov gave a key speech in which he proposed "to abolish mass Party purges... now that the capitalist elements have been eliminated". He declared that the purges had been co-opted by "hostile elements" to "persecute and ruin honest people".

At the conclusion of the Congress in March 1939, Zhdanov was promoted to full membership of the Politburo. He was still one of four secretaries of the Central Committee—the others being Stalin, Andrey Andreyevich Andreyev, and Georgy Malenkov—but Malenkov was not a member of the Politburo, which meant that Zhdanov had replaced Lazar Kaganovich as Stalin's deputy in the party apparatus and appeared to be his most likely successor.

On 29 June 1939, he had a signed article in Pravda in which he expressed what he called his "personal" view "with which my friends do not agree" that Britain and France did not seriously want a military alliance with the Soviet Union. In retrospect, it was the first public hint of the Soviets signing the Molotov–Ribbentrop Pact three months later.

Wartime 

Zhdanov was very publicly associated with the decision to invade Finland in November 1939. In December, he signed the treaty between the Soviets and Finnish puppet government, headed by Otto Wille Kuusinen. As the Leningrad party boss and the official overseeing the navy, he had an interest in increasing the Soviet presence in the Baltic Sea at the expense of Finland, Estonia and Latvia. The final peace treaty between Finland and the Soviet Union was signed by Zhdanov on 12 March 1940.

In June 1940, Zhdanov was sent to Estonia to supervise the establishment of the Estonian Soviet Socialist Republic and its annexation by the Soviet Union. In the United States House of Representatives' 1953–1954 Kersten Committee investigation Zhdanov was one of the accused charged with the 1940 Soviet aggression and forced incorporation of the Baltic states into the USSR.

The Finnish debacle weakened Zhdanov's political standing. In September 1940 he was removed from direct control of the Propaganda Department of the Central Committee, which was taken over by Georgy Aleksandrov, an ally of his rival Malenkov. He was undermined further by the German invasion of the Soviet Union because he had been so publicly associated with the failed pact with Hitler. He was excluded from the State Defense Committee (GOKO), which directed the war effort and was initially controlled by Malenkov and Lavrentiy Beria. According to the historian Anton Antonov-Ovseenko:

Along with Georgy Zhukov, Zhdanov took a leading role during the Siege of Leningrad in the Second World War. In August 1941, he created a City Defence Council but was ordered by Stalin to disband it. When the siege was lifted, he was not officially given credit for saving the city.

After the Moscow Armistice between Finland and the Soviet Union was signed on 4 September 1944, Zhdanov directed the Allied Control Commission in Finland to the Paris Peace Treaty in 1947. That meant that he had to spend several months in Helsinki and relinquish his position as head of the Leningrad party organisation, which he had held for nine years, but he was able to leave it in the hands of his ally, Alexey Kuznetsov. In January 1945, when Pravda celebrated the lifting of the Siege of Leningrad, it emphasised that Malenkov and Vyacheslav Molotov had been dispatched to the city in 1941 and implied that they shared the credit with Zhdanov.

Post-war ascendancy

Zhdanov made a political comeback during 1946, when his main rival, Malenkov, temporarily lost his position as a party secretary. For the next two years, he was delegated by Stalin to direct the Soviet Union's cultural policy and to handle relations with the Eastern European states under or coming under communist control. He formulated what became known as the Zhdanov Doctrine ("The only conflict that is possible in Soviet culture is the conflict between good and best"). In December 1946, he launched the attack on Anna Akhmatova and Mikhail Zoshchenko, two writers living in Zhdanov's former Leningrad fiefdom. He described Akhmatova, arguably then the greatest living Russian poet, as "half nun, half whore". Zhanov was the founding editor-in-chief of the Agitprop journal Kultura i zhizn which he held until 1948.

In 1947, he organised the Cominform, which was designed to coordinate and control the communist parties around the world. At a famous speech at Szklarska Poręba in September 1947, Zhdanov warned his fellow communists that the world was now split into two hostile camps and that the Cominform was needed to oppose the "frank expansionist programme" of the US.

In January 1948, he presided over a three-day conference in the Kremlin, to which more than 70 composers, musicians and music critics, including Dmitri Shostakovich, Sergei Prokofiev, Aram Khachaturian, and Nikolai Myaskovsky were summoned to be lectured by Zhdanov on why they should avoid "formalism" in music. A persistent story is that Zhdanov played the piano during the conference to demonstrate how music should be written, but years later that story was furiously denied by Shostakovich, who attributed it to "toadies". Zhdanov's cultural policy rested on the Soviets' "critically assimilating the cultural heritage of all nations and all times" to "take what was most inspiring".

Fall from power and later life 

In June 1948, Stalin sent Zhdanov to the Cominform meeting in Bucharest. Its purpose was to condemn Yugoslavia, but Zhdanov took a more restrained line than his co-delegate and rival, Georgy Malenkov. That infuriated Stalin, who removed Zhdanov from all his posts and replaced him with Malenkov. Zhdanov was soon transferred to a sanatorium.

Death

Zhdanov died on 31 August 1948 in Moscow of heart failure. It is possible that his death was the result of an intentional misdiagnosis. Zhdanov was buried in the Kremlin Wall Necropolis, in one of the twelve individual tombs located between the Lenin's Mausoleum and the Moscow Kremlin Wall.

Legacy 

Despite his bullying of Akhmatova, Shostakovich, Prokofiev and other cultural figures, and the apparent threat that the founding of Cominform posed to peace, Zhdanov is reckoned by many Soviet scholars to have been a "moderate" within the context of the post-war Stalinist regime. The worst events of Stalin's final years, such as the rift with Yugoslavia, the Leningrad affair, the show trials in Bulgaria, Hungary and Czechoslovakia, and the anti-Semitic Doctors' plot all occurred after Zhdanov was dead. The Leningrad Affair was a brutal purge of Zhdanov's former allies, notably Kuznetsov and Nikolai Voznesensky. The most notable survivor of that purge was future Prime Minister Alexei Kosygin.

In Khrushchev Remembers, Nikita Khrushchev recalled that Zhdanov was an alcoholic and that during his last days, Stalin would shout at him to stop drinking and insist on him drinking only fruit juice. Stalin had talked of Zhdanov being his successor, but Zhdanov's ill health gave his rivals in the Politburo Lavrentiy Beria, Georgy Malenkov, and Nikita Khrushchev, an opportunity to undermine him. Stalin would later blame Zhdanov's death on Kremlin doctors and "Zionist" conspirators.

Zhdanovshchina
Zhdanovshchina was the emphasis on purified communist ideology developed during the war by Zhdanov. It emerged from his arguments inside the party hierarchy opposing the pragmatist faction of Georgy Malenkov. Malenkov stressed the universal values of science and engineering, and proposed to promote the technological experts to the highest positions in the Soviet administrative elite. Zhdanov's faction said proper ideology trumped science and called for prioritizing political education and ideological purity.

However, the technocrats had proven amazingly successful during the war in terms of engineering, industrial production, and the development of advanced munitions. Zhdanov sought to use the ideological purification of the party as a vehicle to restore the Kremlin's political control over the provinces and the technocrats. He worried that the provincial party bosses and the heads of the economic ministries had achieved too high a degree of autonomy during the war, when the top leadership realized the urgent necessity of maximum mobilization of human and material resources. The highest priority in the post-war era was physical reconstruction after the massive wartime destruction.

The same argument that strengthened the technocrats continued to operate, and the united opposition of Malenkov, the technocrats, the provincial party bosses, and the key ministries doomed Zhdanov's proposals. He therefore pivoted to devote his attention to purification of the arts and culture.

Cultural standards 

Originating in 1946 and lasting until the late 1950s, Zhdanov's ideological code, known as the Zhdanov Doctrine or Zhdanovism (zhdanovshchina), defined cultural production in the Soviet Union. Zhdanov intended to create a new philosophy of artistic creation valid for the entire world. His method reduced all of culture to a sort of chart, wherein a given symbol corresponded to a simple moral value.

Zhdanov and his associates further sought to eliminate foreign influence from Soviet art, proclaiming that "incorrect art" was an ideological diversion. This doctrine suggested that the world was split into two opposing camps, namely the "imperialistic", led by the United States; and the "democratic", led by the Soviet Union. The one sentence that came to define his doctrine was "The only conflict that is possible in Soviet culture is the conflict between good and best".

This cultural policy became strictly enforced, censoring writers, artists and the intelligentsia, with punishment being applied for failing to conform to what was considered acceptable by Zhdanov's standards. This policy officially ended in 1952, seen as having a negative impact on culture within the Soviet Union. The origins of this policy can be seen before 1946 when critics proposed (wrongly according to Zhdanov) that Russian classics had been influenced by famous foreign writers, but the policy came into effect specifically to target "apolitical, 'bourgeois', individualistic works of the satirist Mikhail Zoshchenko and the poet Anna Akhmatova", respectively writing for the literary magazines Zvezda and Leningrad. On 20 February 1948, Zhdanovshchina shifted its focus towards anti-formalism, targeting composers such as Dmitri Shostakovich. That April, many of the persecuted composers were pressed into repenting for displaying formalism in their music in a special congress of the Union of Soviet Composers.

Zhdanov was the most openly cultured of the leadership group and his treatment of artists was mild by Soviet standards of the time. He even wrote a satirical sketch ridiculing the attack on modernism.

Family ties 
Zhdanov's son Yuri (1919–2006) married Stalin's daughter Svetlana Alliluyeva in 1949. She described the Zhdanov household as imbued with "an inveterate spirit of bourgeois acquisitiveness ... There were trunkloads of possessions ... The place was presided over by Zinaida Zhdanova, the widow, and the ultimate embodiment of this mixture of Party bigotry and the complacency of the bourgeois woman." In 1952, Yuri Zhdanov was raised to membership of the Central Committee of the Communist Party of the Soviet Union, as head of its Department of Science and Culture, but was sacked very soon after Stalin's death. That marriage ended in divorce in 1952. They had one daughter, Yekaterina.

Honours and awards 
 Two Orders of Lenin
 Order of the Red Banner
 Order of Suvorov, 1st class
 Order of Kutuzov, 1st class
 Order of the Red Banner of Labour
 Medal "For the Defence of Leningrad"
 Medal "For the Victory over Germany in the Great Patriotic War 1941–1945"

Zhdanov's birthplace, Mariupol, was renamed Zhdanov in his honor at Joseph Stalin's instigation in 1948 and a monument to Zhdanov was built in the central square of the city. The name reverted to Mariupol in 1989 and the monument was dismantled in 1990.

See also 
 Engineers of the human soul
 Socialist realism
 Doctors' plot

Notes and references

Further reading 
 Kees Boterbloem (2004). The Life and Times of Andrei Zhdanov, 1896-1948. Montreal: McGill-Queen's University Press.
 Shiela Fitzpatrick (2015). On Stalin's Team: The Years of Living Dangerously in Soviet Politics. Princeton, New Jersey: Princeton University Press.

External links 

 

1896 births
1948 deaths
Politicians from Mariupol
People from Yekaterinoslav Governorate
Censorship in the Soviet Union
Chairmen of the Soviet of the Union
Great Purge perpetrators
Head of Propaganda Department of CPSU CC
Politburo of the Central Committee of the Communist Party of the Soviet Union members
Recipients of the Order of Kutuzov, 1st class
Recipients of the Order of Lenin
Recipients of the Order of the Red Banner
Recipients of the Order of the Red Banner of Labour
Recipients of the Order of Suvorov, 1st class
Stalinism
Anti-revisionists
Old Bolsheviks
Soviet politicians
First Secretaries of the Gorky Regional Committee of the CPSU
Burials at the Kremlin Wall Necropolis
Members of the Supreme Soviet of the Russian Soviet Federative Socialist Republic, 1947–1951